Leyton High School is a school located in Dalton, Nebraska.

The school's sports teams are named the Leyton Warriors. Their colors are cardinal and gold. The Warriors participate in wrestling, football, basketball, track and golf. The Lady Warriors participate in volleyball, basketball, track, and golf.

External links
 Leyton Public Schools
 Leyton Public Schools

Public high schools in Nebraska
Schools in Cheyenne County, Nebraska